Livingston Antony Ruben is an Indian film editor, who works in Tamil and Telugu films.

Career
After graduating with a degree in Visual Communication from Loyola College Chennai. Ruben approached director Gautham Vasudev Menon to become an assistant, who redirected him towards noted film editor, Anthony, to join as assistant editor. Ruben subsequently worked on the production of films including Vettaiyaadu Vilaiyaadu (2006) and Vinnaithaandi Varuvaayaa (2010) under the guidance of Anthony. Ruben was then given the opportunity to work as an editor when preparing trailers for films and managed to work on projects including Thoranai (2009), Avan Ivan (2011) and Vedi (2011).

He made his full debut as an editor with Kandaen (2011), before going on to win acclaim for his work in Elred Kumar's Muppozhudhum Un Karpanaigal (2012), particularly for his work in the "Oru Murai" song. Ruben made a career breakthrough with his work in Raja Rani (2013), which went on to become a commercially successful film and won the editor further big budget projects. He won positive reviews for his work on the song "Oday Oday" for the film, and also played a key part in convincing the team to save funds and not shoot the "Angyaade" song, when a shoot was being prepared with locales in Japan. After having been credited as Antony L. Ruben in his earlier films, he adopted the name Ruben for his future ventures, to avoid being confused with editor Anthony.

Filmography

References

External links

Living people
Date of birth missing (living people)
Year of birth missing (living people)
Tamil film editors
People from Thanjavur district
Film editors from Tamil Nadu